Virbia phalangia is a moth in the family Erebidae first described by George Hampson in 1920. It is found in Mexico.

References

phalangia
Moths described in 1920